Dounia Boutazout (born 13 June 1981) is a Moroccan actress. She has had lead roles in TV serials such as L'Couple, Nayda f’douar and F'Salon.

In April 2016 she said that a woman fractured Boutazout's nose after alleging that Boutazout had jumped a queue that was waiting for official documents.

References 

1981 births
Living people
People from Casablanca
Moroccan television actresses